Paysandú Department is a department of the northwestern region of Uruguay. Its capital is the city of Paysandú. It borders Salto Department to its north, Tacuarembó Department to its east, Río Negro Department to its south and has the Río Uruguay flowing at its west, separating it from Argentina.

The origin of its name is debated but is likely to be of Charrúa origin.

History

The first division of the Republic in six departments happened on 27 January 1816. Two more departments were formed later that year. At that time, Paysandú Department included all the territory north of the Río Negro, which included the actual departments of Artigas, Rivera, Tacuarembó, Salto, Paysandú, and Río Negro. On 17 June 1837, a new division of Uruguay was made and this territory was divided into three parts. In the new division, Paysandú Department included also the actual department of Río Negro, until it was split from it in 1868.

Demographics

As of the census of 2011, Paysandú Department had a population of 113,124 (55,361 male and 57,759 female) and 42,849 households.

Demographic data for Paysandú Department in 2010:
 Population growth rate: 0.250%
 Birth Rate: 16.84 births/1,000 people
 Death Rate: 8.34 deaths/1,000 people
 Average age: 30.8 (29.1 male, 32.7 female)
 Life Expectancy at Birth:
 Total population: 77.03 years
 Male: 73.78 years
 Female: 80.67 years
 Average per household income: 24,543 pesos/month
 Urban per capita income: 9,457 pesos/month
2010 Data Source:

Rural population
According to the 2011 census, Paysandú Department has an additional rural population of 4,364.

Economy

The fertile soils of Paysandú have encouraged much agricultural development. Livestock raising is one of the principal agricultural activities, with cattle being raised for both the dairy and beef industries alongside sheep for wool production. Market-gardening is also prominent with the cultivation of oranges and blueberries, whilst wheat, barley, sunflowers and soya beans are also produced. There is also a small fishing industry on the Uruguay River.

Tourism too, is important for the area. Ecotourism is gaining prominence especially in the Esteros de Farrapos National Park further down the river. In addition many farms provide accommodation and facilities for tourists visiting the area.

Paysandú is home to a large brewery and hosts an annual Semana de la Cerveza (Week of the Beer), a weeklong festival of music, arts, carnival type rides, and beer.

Map of the department

See also
 List of populated places in Uruguay#Paysandú Department

References

External links

 INE map of Paysandú Department 
 Nuestra Terra, Colección Los Departamentos, Vol.11 "Paysandú"

 
Departments of Uruguay
States and territories established in 1820